Brendan O'Reilly (14 May 1929 – 1 April 2001) was an Irish Selected Olympic high jumper, broadcaster, journalist, actor, singer and songwriter (best known for the 'Ballad of Michael Collins' and the Olympic song, 'Let the Nations Play'.  He is best known as presenter of the long-running Sports Stadium.
Between 1966 and 1968, O'Reilly had the honour of commentating for Ireland at the Eurovision Song Contest, as well as presenting the National Song Contest (to select Ireland's Eurovision entry) from 1966 to 1970.

He was a High Jumper, studied in America at the University of Michigan, he set the Irish High Jump record and also set the Irish Javelin record.

He also acted in the 1971 film Flight of the Doves playing Police Inspector Michael Roark, and also played roles in After Midnight (1990) and the television series Mystic Knights of Tir Na Nog

He is survived by his eldest son the musician and filmmaker Myles O'Reilly, Dublin Publican Rossa O'Reilly, Kelan O'Reilly, Hannah O'Reilly and his wife Johanna O'Reilly.

References

External links

1929 births
2001 deaths
RTÉ newsreaders and journalists
RTÉ television presenters
People from County Longford
University of Michigan alumni
Rose of Tralee hosts